Malate dehydrogenase (decarboxylating) or NAD-malic enzyme (NAD-ME) is an enzyme that catalyzes the chemical reaction
(S)-malate + NAD+  pyruvate + CO2 + NADH

Thus, the two substrates of this enzyme are (S)-malate and NAD+, whereas its three products are pyruvate, CO2, and NADH. Malate is oxidized to pyruvate and CO2, and NAD+ is reduced to NADH.

This enzyme belongs to the family of oxidoreductases, to be specific, those acting on the CH-OH group of donor with NAD+ or NADP+ as acceptor. The systematic name of this enzyme class is (S)-malate:NAD+ oxidoreductase (decarboxylating). This enzyme participates in pyruvate metabolism and carbon fixation. NAD-malic enzyme is one of three decarboxylation enzymes used in the inorganic carbon concentrating mechanisms of C4 and CAM plants. The others are NADP-malic enzyme and PEP carboxykinase.

References

 

EC 1.1.1
NADH-dependent enzymes